Béla Gerster (20 October 1850 – 3 August 1923) was a Hungarian engineer and canal architect.  He took part in an early expedition to determine the route of the Panama Canal, and was the chief engineer of the Corinth Canal.

Background
Béla Gerster was born in 1850 at Kassa (Kaschau/Košice), (then in the Habsburg Empire, at present in Slovakia) . He graduated from the Vienna University of Technology and he also started his profession in this city as a civil engineer. He was a respected expert on water constructions. He accompanied Ferdinand Marie de Lesseps and István Türr in an early international expedition in 1876 with the task to locate the most suitable route of an interoceanic canal. He proposed an area between Panama and Colón.

After István Türr was granted permission by the Greek government to revive the long abandoned idea works of cutting through of the Corinthian Isthmus (it was Emperor Nero who first attempted this in 68 AD). Gerster was given charge over making the plans in 1881. Afterwards he supervised the whole project as the chief engineer of the canal building company; his co-workers in this endeavour were another four Hungarian engineers: István Kauser, László Nyári, Garibaldi Pulszky and István Stéghmüller. The construction lasted for 11 years (1882–1893). The Corinth Canal is 6,343 metres long; its width amounts to 25 metres, its depth 8 metres and the earth cliffs flanking it reach a maximum height of 63 metres.
Gerster wrote about his experiences in his Hungarian-French bilingual book "A korinthusi földszoros és átmetszése" / "Cutting through the Corinthian Isthmus". This book features a lot of photographs, construction drawings and maps. He also laid out a railway line from Athens to Larisa.

He participated in the development of István Türr's monumental plans of water-supply engineering in Hungary. Later on he conducted the designing, construction and building of 13 major railway lines in Hungary. Lastly, in 1919 he administered the works at the Duna-Tisza Canal. He died in Budapest, Hungary in 1923.

See also

 History of the Panama Canal

References

Further reading
Bela Gerster, "L'Isthme de Corinthe: tentatives de percement dans l'antiquité", Bulletin de Correspondance Hellénique 8 (1884), pp. 225–232

External links
 

1850 births
1923 deaths
People from Košice
TU Wien alumni
Danube-Swabian people
Hungarian people of German descent
Hungarian architects
Hungarian canal engineers